Jean Cristofol (1901–1957) was a French Communist politician. He was a député in the National Assembly of France from 1936 to 1940, and from 1946 to 1957, then Mayor of Marseille, the second largest city in France, from 1946 to 1947.

Biography
Jean Joseph Antoine Cristofol was born on 24 March 1901 in Aja-Vilallovent,. He became a député in the French National Assembly in 1936. In April 1940, he was sent to prison by the Vichy government for being a Communist. He was released in 1943, and became a député again in 1944. He was the Mayor of Marseille from 1946 to 1947. He died on 21 November 1957 in Villejuif, France.

References

1901 births
1957 deaths
People from Cerdanya (comarca)
French people of Spanish descent
French Communist Party politicians
Members of the 16th Chamber of Deputies of the French Third Republic
Members of the Constituent Assembly of France (1945)
Members of the Constituent Assembly of France (1946)
Deputies of the 1st National Assembly of the French Fourth Republic
Deputies of the 2nd National Assembly of the French Fourth Republic
Deputies of the 3rd National Assembly of the French Fourth Republic
Mayors of Marseille
Deaths from lung cancer in France
Members of the General Confederation of Labour (France)